Shalom Sesame is an anglicized variation of Rechov Sumsum (רחוב סומסום), the Israeli version of Sesame Street, which originally aired in 1983. Shalom Sesame was produced in 1986 and 1990 for public television stations in the United States, aimed at introducing Israel and Judaism to children that are not necessarily fluent in the Hebrew language, since Rechov Sumsum is completely done in Hebrew.  Unlike the main Sesame Street series, Shalom Sesame was independently distributed to PBS-member stations, and not by PBS themselves.

It includes characters from both Sesame Street and Rechov Sumsum, the Hebrew/Arabic version of Sesame Street, produced and aired in Israel, the Palestinian territories, and Jordan.

Also, as with the American series, the series featured special guests well known to American viewers. Guests included Itzhak Perlman, Bonnie Franklin, Mary Tyler Moore, Mandy Patinkin, Alan King, Joan Rivers, Nell Carter, Jerry Stiller, Jeremy Miller, Anne Meara, Tracey Gold, B.B. King, Sarah Jessica Parker, and Paul Shaffer.

In October 2010, a new 12-part Shalom Sesame series began, with stars including Jake Gyllenhaal, Christina Applegate, Debra Messing, Greg Kinnear, Anneliese van der Pol, and Cedric the Entertainer. The new series added Mahboub, an Arab Israeli muppet, and other new characters from the 2006 revival of Rechov Sumsum. It also features the Israeli singer Ayal Ingedashet, of Ethiopian Jewish background, as the human character Lamlam in each series.

Characters from Rechov Sumsum
 Kipi Ben Kipod, (קיפי בן קיפוד) (translated means Kippi son of Hedgehog) a pink, giant, cheerful and optimistic hedgehog (incorrectly referred to as a porcupine) analogous to Big Bird, he has a pet goat named Sheba. Kippi first appeared on Rechov Sumsum in 1983, and Kippi also appeared in Barrio Sésamo as Espinete, A big, human-sized pink hedgehog that does not wear clothes during the day, despite having used disguises (including a wizard, Dracula and a superhero called Super Espi), Initially, lived in a forest with other hedgehogs, then moved to Barrio Sésamo, where he wanted to live "under a tree". Human adults in Barrio Sésamo tried to convince him to live in a normal house, but the children disagreed. Finally, it was decided that he would live in a garage, owned by one of the adults but not used, which was adapted into a room, seems to be just as childlike as other children in the Barrio. Sometimes, however, does show a greater degree of knowledge: for example, being familiar with the concept of a password while other children, and even adults, are not, and, along with other international Sesame Street Muppets, in the special Sesame Street Stays Up Late.,
 Moishe Oofnik, Oscar the Grouch's cousin
 Brosh, an orange monster who likes cleaning
 Mahboub, a young blue monster who speaks both Hebrew and Arabic
 Avigail, a young pink monster who likes to play and is happy with everyone

Characters from Sesame Street
 Bert and Ernie a.k.a. "Benz and Arik" (Bert Frank Oz, 1969–1998 and Eric Jacobson, 1998-present, Ernie Jim Henson, 1969–1990, Steve Whitmire, 1990–2014 and Billy Barkhurst 2014-2018)
 Count von Count a.k.a. "Mar Sofer" (Jerry Nelson, 1969–2012 and Matt Vogel, 2012-present)
 Cookie Monster a.k.a. "Ugifletzet" (Frank Oz, 1969–2001 and David Rudman, 2001-present)
 Kermit the Frog a.k.a. "Kermit haTzfardea" (Jim Henson, 1969–1990, Steve Whitmire, 1990-2017 and Matt Vogel, 2017-present)
 Grover, a blue monster from Sesame Street

Books
 Shalom Sesame Presents a Chanukah Party for Kippi is a book written by Louise Follow based on the Shalom Sesame series. It was published by Comet International as a paperback in August 1995..
 It's a Mitzvah, Grover! by Tilda Balsley (Author), Ellen Fischer (Author), Tom Leigh (Illustrator), 
 Grover and Big Bird's Passover Celebration by Tilda Balsley (Author), Ellen Fischer (Author), Tom Leigh (Illustrator), 
 The Count's Hanukkah Countdown by Tilda Balsley (Author), Ellen Fischer (Author), Tom Leigh (Illustrator),

Episode list

1986 series
 "The Land of Israel"
 "Tel Aviv"
 "Kibbutz"
 "The People of Israel"
 "Jerusalem"

1990 series
 "Chanukah"
 "Sing Around the Seasons"
 "Journey to Secret Places"

1991 series
 "Aleph-Bet Telethon"
 "Passover"
 "Kids Sing Israel"

2010 series
 "Welcome to Israel"
 "Chanukah: The Missing Menorah"

2011 series
 "Shabbat Shalom, Grover!"
 "Grover Plants a Tree"
 "Mitzvah on the Street"
 "Be Happy, It's Purim!"
 "It's Passover, Grover!"
 "Grover Learns Hebrew"
 "Countdown to Shavuot"
 "The Sticky Shofar"
 "Monsters in the Sukkah"
 "Adventures in Israel"

Home media
In the 1990s, the entire series was released on home video, in the VHS format.

In the mid-2000s, SISU Home Entertainment, a U.S. marketer and distributor of Israeli and Jewish video, audio, book, and multimedia properties] released the entire series on a five-disc DVD set, available as a set or per disc.

References

External links
 Shalom Sesame: official website
 Israel 21c" Shalom Sesame

Sesame Street international co-productions
Israeli television shows featuring puppetry
Television series about Jews and Judaism
American television series revived after cancellation
Religious educational television series
1987 American television series debuts
1987 Israeli television series debuts
1991 American television series endings
2010 American television series debuts
2011 American television series endings
1980s American children's television series
1990s American children's television series
2010s American children's television series
1980s preschool education television series
1990s preschool education television series
2010s preschool education television series
American preschool education television series
American television spin-offs
PBS Kids shows